The 1996 college football season may refer to:

 1996 NCAA Division I-A football season
 1996 NCAA Division I-AA football season
 1996 NCAA Division II football season
 1996 NCAA Division III football season
 1996 NAIA Division I football season
 1996 NAIA Division II football season